The IA2 assault rifle, designed and built in Brazil by IMBEL, is designed to replace the FAL, M16A2 and HK33 currently in service with the Brazilian Armed Forces.

History 
The IA2 was created by Lieutenant Colonel Paulo Augusto Capetti Rodrigues Porto of the Brazilian Armaments Industry (IMBEL), to replace FN FAL and its variants in the ranks of the Brazilian Army. After the Army realized that IMBEL MD-97 could not meet the basic requirements to replace the FAL, IMBEL began to modernize the MD-97 project, but the simple modernization of the project, which used many FAL parts, was not enough to meet the needs of the Army.

With this, the project of a totally new weapon began in 2012, initially named as MD-97 Mk.II, not just a modernization of the MD-97, but a totally new rifle.  It was unveiled in 2010, when it began to be tested in the Center of Evaluations of Army (CAEx), in the test field of Marambaia, Rio de Janeiro. In 2012, the Army commissioned the initial order of 1,500 IA-2 rifles, in the 5.56×45mm NATO and 7.62×51mm NATO model, to be distributed for testing between Various units of the Army, such as the Special Operations Brigade, the Parachute Infantry Brigade and the Jungle Infantry Brigades.

The final product performed over 70 thousand fire shots, and was subjected to endurance tests, sand, dust, high and low temperatures as well as immersion in water, followed by firing. The performance in tests in the jungle environment proved its reliability, as well as its run time of 15 seconds after submersion. Its performance was also tested in parachuting, caatinga and special operations.

In 2012, tests were carried out for the operational evaluation of 20 rifles at the Brazilian Marine Corps through COMANF, the Battalion Riverine Operations and 3rd Infantry Battalion of Marines, under the coordination of Board of Navy Weapon Systems (DSAM) and Equipment Command of the Marines (CMatFN).  The performance of the rifle was evaluated under operational conditions, where was verified, for example, its compatibility with the individual equipment of the military and its resistance to impacts and contact with sand, water or mud.

In December 2013 the Brazilian Army placed an order for 20,000 rifles in 5.56. In 2016, it was announced that CAEx would be testing five prototypes of the Fz 7.62 version.

Design
The IA2 comes in 2 calibers: 5.56×45mm NATO and 7.62×51mm NATO. It is not a Modular Weapon System like Colt CM901, Remington ACR, CZ 805, or Beretta ARX-160. 

The 7.62 NATO variant still uses the FAL operating system (tilting breechblock) versus the 5.56's rotating bolt. The IA2 makes extensive use of polymers, and features a non-reciprocating cocking handle on the left side of the receiver. The 5.56 variant accepts an M16 compatible STANAG magazine, while the 7.62 accepts FAL magazines. The IA2's gas system is manually adjustable.

Due to integrated Picatinny rails the IA2 supports a wide range of equipment and accessories such as scopes, flashlights, grenade launchers, lasers, etc.

Variants
IMBEL A2 Rifle 5.56mm 17.7"
IMBEL A2 5.56mm Carbine 14.5"
IMBEL A2 7.62mm assault rifle/carbine

Users

 Brazilian Army
 Brazilian Navy
 Brazilian Air Force
 State Military Police
Military Brigade of Rio Grande do Sul
Military Police of Paraná State
Military Police of Minas Gerais State
Military Police of São Paulo State
Military Police of Espírito Santo State
Military Police of Rio de Janeiro State
Military Police of Goiás State
Military Police of Acre State
 State Civil Police
Civil Police of the Federal District
Civil Police of Rio de Janeiro State
 National Public Security Force
 Federal Highway Police
 Federal Police of Brazil
 Receita Federal do Brasil
 National Prison Department (Brazil)
 Brazilian Institute of Environment and Renewable Natural Resources

Sources

References

IA2
5.56 mm assault rifles
7.62×51mm NATO rifles
Police weapons
Rifles of Brazil
IMBEL firearms